Dorcadion faldermanni is a species of beetle in the family Cerambycidae. It was described by Ludwig Ganglbauer in 1884. It is known from Iran.

References

faldermanni
Beetles described in 1884